This glossary of literary terms is a list of definitions of terms and concepts used in the discussion, classification, analysis, and criticism of all types of literature, such as poetry, novels, and picture books, as well as of grammar, syntax, and language techniques. For a more complete glossary of terms relating to poetry in particular, see Glossary of poetry terms.

A

B

C

D

E

F

G

H

I

J

K

L

M

N

O

P

Q

R

S

T

U

V

W

Z

See also
Glossary of poetry terms
Index of literature articles
Literary criticism
Literary theory

References

Further reading
M. H. Abrams. A Glossary of Literary Terms. Thomson-Wadsworth, 2005. .
Chris Baldick. The Concise Dictionary of Literary Terms. Oxford Univ. Press, 2004. .
Chris Baldick. The Concise Oxford Dictionary of Literary Terms. Oxford Univ. Press, 2001. .
Edwin Barton & G. A. Hudson. Contemporary Guide To Literary Terms. Houghton-Mifflin, 2003. .
Mark Bauerlein. Literary Criticism: An Autopsy. Univ. of Pennsylvania Press, 1997. .
Karl Beckson & Arthur Ganz. Literary Terms: A Dictionary. Farrar, Straus and Giroux, 1989. .
Peter Childs. The Routledge Dictionary of Literary Terms. Routledge, 2005. .
J. A. Cuddon. The Penguin Dictionary of Literary Terms and Literary Theory. Penguin Books, 2000.  .
Dana Gioia. The Longman Dictionary of Literary Terms: Vocabulary for the Informed Reader. Longman, 2005. .
 Garner, Bryan. Garner's Modern English Usage. Oxford University Press, 2016. 
Sharon Hamilton. Essential Literary Terms: A Brief Norton Guide with Exercises. W. W. Norton, 2006. .
William Harmon. A Handbook to Literature. Prentice Hall, 2005. .
X. J. Kennedy, et al. Handbook of Literary Terms: Literature, Language, Theory. Longman, 2004. .
V. B. Leitch. The Norton Anthology of Theory and Criticism. W. W. Norton, 2001. .
Frank Lentricchia & Thomas McLaughlin. Critical Terms for Literary Study. Univ. of Chicago Press, 1995. .
David Mikics. A New Handbook of Literary Terms. Yale Univ. Press, 2007. .
Ross Murfin & S. M. Ray. The Bedford Glossary of Critical and Literary Terms. Bedford/St. Martin's, 2006. .
John Peck & Martin Coyle. Literary Terms and Criticism. Palgrave Macmillan, 2002. .
Edward Quinn. A Dictionary of Literary And Thematic Terms. Checkmark Books, 2006. .
Lewis Turco. The Book of Literary Terms: The Genres of Fiction, Drama, Nonfiction, Literary Criticism, and Scholarship. Univ. Press of New England, 1999. .

Wikipedia glossaries
Terms
Terms

Literature lists
Wikipedia glossaries using description lists